Shanty Town is an unincorporated community in Salem Township, Olmsted County, Minnesota, United States, near Byron.  The community is located along Olmsted County Road 150 near 35th Street SW.

References

Unincorporated communities in Olmsted County, Minnesota
Unincorporated communities in Minnesota